United Nations Security Council Resolution 34, adopted on September 15, 1947, removed disputes between Greece and Albania, Yugoslavia and Bulgaria, from the Council's agenda.

The resolution was approved by nine votes to two (Poland and Soviet Union).

See also
List of United Nations Security Council Resolutions 1 to 100 (1946–1953)
United Nations Security Council Resolution 15

References
Text of the Resolution at undocs.org

External links
 

 0034
1947 in Yugoslavia
Albania–Greece border
 0034
 0034
 0034
 0034
1947 in Bulgaria
1947 in Albania
1947 in Greece
September 1947 events